Saul Sanchez may refer to:
 Saúl Sánchez, Mexican football goalkeeper
 Saul Sanchez (boxer), American boxer